Archbishop Józef Weber, C.R. (12 June 1846 – 24 March 1918) was a Roman Catholic prelate, who served as an Auxiliary Bishop of the Roman Catholic Archdiocese of Lviv from 2 December 1895 until his resignation on 26 May 1906 and hold the titles of a Titular Bishop of Temnos from 2 December 1895 until 15 April 1901 and a Titular Archbishop of Darnis from 15 April 1901 until his death on 24 March 1918.

Life
Archbishop Weber was born in a  German Bohemian family of the colonists in Bukovina. After graduation from the school and gymnasium education, he subsequently joined the Faculty of Theology at the University of Lviv and the Major Roman Catholic Theological Seminary in Lviv. After that he continued to study in the Polish College in Rome, where he was ordained as priest on June 7, 1873, for the Roman Catholic Archdiocese of Lviv, while completed of the philosophical and theological studies. In time of his studies he wished to join the Resurrectionists, inspired by the Rector of Polish College Fr. Piotr Semenenko, C.R., but his Archbishop asked him to postpone his decision.

After returning from Italy, he served as a chancellor of the Metropolitan curia and a spiritual director in a Major Roman Catholic Theological Seminary in Lviv. At the same time, from 1881, he became a director and curator of the Resurrectionist Congregation for 25 years.

On December 2, 1895, he was appointed by the Pope Leo XIII as an  Auxiliary Bishop of the Roman Catholic Archdiocese of Lviv and a Titular Bishop of Temnos. On December 29, 1895, he was consecrated as bishop by Metropolitan Archbishop Seweryn Morawski and other prelates of the Roman Catholic and Armenian Catholic Churches in the Cathedral Basilica of the Assumption, Lviv. In the same time he was nominated as an Episcopal Vicar for Bukovina (1895–1906), that was a part of the Archdiocese of Lviv.

On April 15, 1901 he was elevated in the rank of Archbishop with title of Darnis, remained an auxiliary bishop.

On May 26, 1906 Archbishop Weber resigned as an auxiliary bishop and joined the Resurrectionist Congregation, were made a profession on June 24, 1906. Rest his life he lived in Rome and later, from 1909, in the United States. He served as a Superior of the American-Canadian province of the Resurrectionists from 1911 until his death in 1918.

References

1846 births
1918 deaths
People from Suceava County
Polish Austro-Hungarians
Polish people of German descent
University of Lviv alumni
Resurrectionist Congregation
19th-century Roman Catholic bishops in Austria-Hungary
20th-century Roman Catholic archbishops in Poland
Ukrainian Roman Catholic archbishops
Austro-Hungarian expatriates in the United States